The following radio stations broadcast on AM frequency 1460 kHz: 1460 AM is a Regional broadcast frequency.

Argentina
 LT29 in Venado Tuerto, Santa Fe
 LU30 in Maipu, Buenos Aires
 LU34 Pigüé, Buenos Aires
 LRK204 in Yerba Buena, Tucuman
 "Radio Contacto" - San Antonio de Padua, Buenos Aires

Canada
 CJOY in Guelph, Ontario - 10 kW, transmitter located at

Guatemala (Channel 93)
TGRN in Flores

Mexico
 XEYC-AM in Ciudad Juárez, Chihuahua
 XECB-AM in San Luis Río Colorado, Sonora
 XEKC-AM in Oaxaca City, Oaxaca

United States

References

Lists of radio stations by frequency